Robin Fox MC (15 July 1913 – 20 January 1971) was an English actor, theatrical agent, and chairman of the English Stage Company, best remembered as the founder of a family of actors. His sons are Edward, James, and Robert Fox. His grandchildren include Emilia, Laurence, Jack and Freddie Fox.

Early life
Fox was born in the parish of St George's, Hanover Square, Westminster, the son of Arthur William Fox and Hilda Louise Fox (formerly the actress Hilda Hanbury, real name Hilda Louise Alcock), a member of Herbert Beerbohm Tree's theatrical company), and was the grandson of Samson Fox (1838–1903), a British engineer and philanthropist, principal founder of the Royal College of Music and inventor of the corrugated boiler flue. His mother and his aunt Lily Hanbury were first cousins of Julia Neilson, mother of Phyllis and Dennis Neilson-Terry. Julia Neilson was married to Fred Terry, brother of Dame Ellen Terry. Altogether seven of his cousins were actors.

Career
During the Second World War, Fox became an officer cadet and in August 1940 was commissioned into the Royal Artillery. In February 1945, he was awarded the Military Cross. He rose to the rank of acting major.

Becoming a theatrical agent, by the 1960s Fox was the senior partner of the Robin Fox Organization, with offices in Regent Street. As well as representing many performers, including Julie Christie, Paul Scofield, Marianne Faithfull, and Maggie Smith, he also acted on behalf of film-makers, of whom one was Joseph Losey.

In 1962, Fox quarrelled bitterly with Tony Richardson, when he attempted to forbid his friend Richardson from giving his son James "Willie" Fox a part in the film The Loneliness of the Long Distance Runner. Fox claimed Willie had no talent for acting and should not give up his job in a bank.

In 1966, Robin Fox appeared in a cameo role in the film Modesty Blaise, as a man who rings a doorbell.

In 1970, Fox and Oscar Lewenstein jointly succeeded Neville Blond as chairman of the English Stage Company, but Fox died from cancer only six months later.

Personal life

Fox married Angela Worthington, an actress and the illegitimate daughter of the English playwright Frederick Lonsdale. She had been the subject of Noël Coward's song "Don't Put Your Daughter on the Stage, Mrs Worthington!" She wrote two books about her life and marriage, Slightly Foxed (1986) and Completely Foxed, and revealed that when she was newly married and first pregnant Fox told her "You do know that I have no intention of being faithful to you. I shall sleep with whoever I like". They had three sons, Edward, James, and Robert Fox.

Fox has been called "a notorious philanderer", and his conquests are reported to have included Princess Marina of Greece and Denmark, the widow of Prince George, Duke of Kent. He had a long affair with Rosalind Chatto, wife of the actor Tom Chatto, who was his secretary before she became an agent on her own account, and is claimed to be the father of her son, Daniel Chatto.

At the time of his death Fox was living at Ockenden Cottage, Cuckfield, Sussex. He left an estate valued at £102,625.

Filmography

References

External links
 
 Robin Fox at geni.com
 Robin Fox at thepeerage.com

1913 births
1971 deaths
Deaths from cancer in England
Male actors from London
English talent agents
Recipients of the Military Cross
Royal Artillery officers
Robin Fox family
People from Westminster
British Army personnel of World War II